Taroman is the highest mountain in the Cova Lima district of East Timor.

Sources
 Lolo Taroman

Mountains of East Timor
Cova Lima Municipality